The NewYork-Presbyterian Hospital is a nonprofit academic medical center in New York City affiliated with two Ivy League medical schools, Cornell University and Columbia University. The hospital comprises seven distinct campuses located in the New York metropolitan area. The hospital's two flagship medical centers are Columbia University Irving Medical Center and Weill Cornell Medical Center.

, the hospital is ranked as the seventh best hospital in the United States and the second in the New York City metropolitan area by U.S. News & World Report.

The hospital has more than 6,500 affiliated physicians, 20,000 employees and 2,600 beds in total. It is one of the largest hospitals in the world. NYPH annually treats about 310,000 patients in its emergency department and delivers about 15,000 babies.

History

NewYork-Presbyterian Hospital was founded in 1771 as New York Hospital by Edinburgh Medical School graduate Samuel Bard. It received a Royal Charter granted by King George III of Great Britain and became associated with Weill Cornell Medical College upon Weill Cornell's founding in 1898.  It is the third oldest hospital in the United States, after NYC Health + Hospitals/Bellevue in New York City (1736) and Pennsylvania Hospital (1751).

A 1927 endowment of more than $20 million by Payne Whitney expanded the hospital significantly and the Payne Whitney Psychiatric Clinic is named in his honor. Other prominent donors have included Howard Hughes, William Randolph Hearst, Harry and Leona Helmsley, Maurice R. Greenberg, and the Baker, Whitney, Lasdon, and Payson families.

The Presbyterian Hospital was founded in 1868 by James Lenox, a New York philanthropist and Columbia University College of Physicians and Surgeons, also founded by Samuel Bard in 1767.  In 1910, Columbia University and Presbyterian Hospital reached an agreement to affiliate, forming the world's first academic health center through the merger of existing institutions.  During the 1920s, Edward S. Harkness and Anna Harkness purchased land and funded the construction of Columbia-Presbyterian Medical Center. In 1928, the two institutions fully moved to the new medical center.

In 1925, the Sloane Hospital for Women, a leader in obstetrics and gynecology that had been founded in 1886, was incorporated. In 1928, Sloan, along with The Squier Urological Clinic and the Vanderbilt Clinic, moved to Columbia Presbyterian Medical Center.

New York Hospital was the subject of a lawsuit from the family of Libby Zion, a young woman admitted in 1984 who died while under the care of overworked hospital residents. An investigation by the New York State Health Commissioner, the Bell Commission, led to restrictions on the number of hours residents could work and required oversight of their care by accredited physicians (this regulation is also known as the Libby Zion law).  These reforms have since been adopted nationwide.

NewYork-Presbyterian Hospital, chartered as The New York and Presbyterian Hospital by the State of New York in 1996, was formed in 1998 with the merger of two large, previously independent hospitals, the New York Hospital and Presbyterian Hospital. The merger had been announced on January 1, 1998.

In the 2010s, the hospital began to supplement its physical presence with remote and online services.  A telemedicine service allows patients to receive follow-up care remotely, a CAT-equipped ambulance (see below NYP-EMS) allows stroke care to take place outside the hospital, and a remote second opinion program uses Grand Rounds technology.

During the initial phase COVID-19 pandemic, NYP was at the center of the country's response to the virus in the spring of 2020. The hospital was able to triple its ICU bed capacity and ventilator support. During the crisis, teams at NYP/Columbia pioneered techniques to assist two patients with one ventilator and shared this around the country. NYP turned Baker Field and Columbia Soccer Stadium into a 288-bed field hospital in under two weeks.

As with many hospitals in the US, clinicians volunteered to help understaffed units. Over 1,000 people volunteered at NYP including teams from University of Rochester Medical Center, UCSF Medical Center, Cayuga Medical Center, Mayo Clinic, Cleveland Clinic, University of Pittsburgh Medical Center, UAMS Medical Center, Intermountain Medical Center, and Dartmouth–Hitchcock Medical Center. In November 2020, despite cases surged in Utah, a team of 31 nurses and staff from NYP traveled to Intermountain Health to 'return the favor'.

On October 13, 2020, with a gift from Ray Dalio, NYP launched the Dalio Center for Health Justice, a research and advocacy organization, which will focus on reducing differences in access to quality health care that overwhelmingly affect communities of color.

Structure

NYP is a 501(c)(3) nonprofit system that includes a variety of outlying hospitals that had been affiliates of the legacy Hospitals, NewYork or Presbyterian.  These hospitals stretch throughout the five boroughs, Westchester County, Long Island and New Jersey.

The hospital, along with Weill Cornell Medicine and Columbia University Vagelos College of Physicians and Surgeons, runs the NewYork-Presbyterian Healthcare System, a network of independent, cooperating, acute-care and community hospitals, continuum-of-care facilities, home-health agencies, ambulatory sites, and specialty institutes in the New York metropolitan area. The two medical schools remain essentially autonomous, though there is increasing cooperation and coordination of clinical, research, and residency training programs. The hospitals have merged administrations, with Herb Pardes, MD, leading the combined hospitals from 2000 to 2011.  Steven Corwin, MD is now the Hospital system CEO.

The institution's facilities are:
NewYork-Presbyterian/Columbia University Irving Medical Center
NewYork-Presbyterian/Weill Cornell Medical Center
NewYork-Presbyterian Komansky Children's Hospital
NewYork-Presbyterian Allen Hospital
NewYork-Presbyterian Morgan Stanley Children's Hospital
NewYork-Presbyterian Westchester Behavioral Health Center, formerly the Payne Whitney Psychiatric Clinic, and before that Bloomingdale Insane Asylum
NewYork-Presbyterian Lower Manhattan Hospital
NewYork-Presbyterian Westchester
NewYork-Presbyterian Hudson Valley Hospital
NewYork-Presbyterian Queens
NewYork-Presbyterian Brooklyn Methodist Hospital

Awards and recognition

As of 2022, the U.S. News & World Report rankings place NYPH overall as the seventh best hospital in the United States. Every specialty was ranked in the top 50 by US News, and the following were ranked in the top 10 of hospitals around the country: cardiology and heart surgery (No. 4), pediatric cardiology and heart surgery (No. 5), diabetes / endocrinology (No. 4), geriatrics (No. 6), neurology / neurosurgery (No. 3), orthopedics (No. 10), psychiatry (No. 4), urology (No. 5), and rheumatology (No. 3), a collaborative program with the Hospital for Special Surgery.

Emergency medical services

NewYork-Presbyterian Emergency Medical Services (NYP-EMS) is a hospital-based ambulance service that has operated since 1981. NYP-EMS also operates critical care transport ambulances throughout the New York City Metropolitan Area.  The service is licensed to operate in the 5 boroughs of New York City, Westchester, Putnam, and Dutchess counties in New York, and in the state of New Jersey for Basic Life Support and Specialty Care Transport.
NYP-EMS provides emergency and non-emergency ambulance services, through the New York City 911 system and through the NYP-EMS Communications Center at Weill Cornell Medical Center.  It also provides stand-by EMS services for events throughout the New York City area, including the Avon Walk for Breast Cancer and the NYC Triathlon.

NYP-EMS is also a New York State Department of Health-approved training center for EMT and Paramedic programs, several of which are approved for college-level credit by the New York State Department of Education. NYP-EMS operates one of the largest American Heart Association Emergency Cardiac Care training centers in New York.
NYP-EMS also maintains a Special Operations team trained in hazardous materials decontamination and technical rescue. This team, accompanied by several Weill Cornell Physicians, provided rescue and relief support on the Gulf Coast of Mississippi in the aftermath of Hurricane Katrina in 2005. Most recently, the team decontaminated 28 patients after the 2007 New York City steam explosion in Midtown Manhattan on July 18, 2007.

In 2016 NYP purchased and fielded the first mobile stroke unit on the East Coast  and as of 2018 is only Hospital in the country to field three such units. NYP-EMS operates 3 mobile stroke units based in Manhattan, Brooklyn and Queens.

Four of NYP's hospital complexes within the five boroughs of New York are rated as level I or II trauma centers by the state of New York.

Facilities

Columbia University Irving Medical Center

The NewYork-Presbyterian Hospital / Columbia University Irving Medical Center is located on West 168th Street in the Washington Heights neighborhood of New York City. It contains an emergency room, an eye institute, a chapel, a garden, and more. It is situated on a  campus in the Washington Heights community of Manhattan and accounting for roughly half of Columbia University's nearly $3 billion annual budget, it provides leadership in scientific research, medical education, and more. New York Presbyterian Hospital and Columbia University Irving Medical Center are well known for their strong affiliation with the Neurological Institute of New York, which houses the departments of Neurology and Neurological Surgery as well as numerous research laboratories.

Weill Cornell Medical Center

Cornell Medical College was founded in 1898, and established an affiliation agreement with New York Hospital in 1913. The Medical College is divided into 20 academic departments. It is among the top-ranked clinical and medical research centers in the United States of America, although the U.S. Department of Health & Human Services' Medicare program adjudged its rate of admission for heart failure patients to be worse than the national rate. Also housed here is the New York-Presbyterian Phyllis and David Komansky Center for Children's Health.  Located at 525 East 68th Street on the Upper East Side in Manhattan (E.68th and York Avenue), New York City, the Komansky Center for Children's Health is a full-service pediatric "hospital within a hospital."  The Komansky Center was listed on the 2009 U.S. News & World Report "America's Best Children's Hospitals" "Honor Roll" and one of only 10 children's hospitals in the nation to be ranked in all 10 clinical specialties.

In August 2011, Becker's Hospital Review listed the New York-Presbyterian Hospital/ Weill Cornell Medical Center as number 4 of the 100 Top Grossing Hospitals in America with $7.52 billion in gross revenue.

Allen Hospital

The Allen Hospital is located at 5141 Broadway and West 220th Street in northernmost part of the Inwood neighborhood of Manhattan. The General Surgery Group of The Allen Hospital specialize in the treatment of hernias and gallbladder diseases. The Hospitalist group and Internal Medicine and Family Medicine residents care for the adult medical patients. There is an active Labor and Delivery Department. It also has the Mila Conanan Memorial Chapel, named after Mila P. Conanan, who had been on the medical center staff for 20 years and the operating rooms director at the Allen Pavilion for three years before her death in 1990.

In 2020, Allen Hospital faced the COVID-19 pandemic along with the city. Among the casualties was the medical director of the emergency department, Dr Lorna Breen. After contracting the COVID-19 coronavirus whilst treating patients and returning to work after recuperation, the police department in Charlottesville, Virginia, released a statement that Dr Breen had died as a result of self-inflicted wounds shortly after they responded to an emergency call at her family home and she was taken to UVA hospital. Police Chief RaShall Brackney was quoted in an official statement:

Morgan Stanley Children's Hospital

Located on 3959 Broadway (165th Street and Broadway), New York City, NewYork-Presbyterian Morgan Stanley Children's Hospital is a pediatric hospital in New York–Presbyterian Hospital. They are especially known for their expertise in pediatric heart surgery. It was listed on the 2009 U.S. News & World Report "America's Best Children's Hospitals" "Honor Roll" and one of only 10 children's hospitals in the nation to be ranked in all 10 clinical specialties. The hospital houses the only pediatric Level 1 Trauma Center in Manhattan.

Komansky Children's Hospital
Komansky Children's Hospital is a pediatric acute care hospital located within Weill Cornell Medical Center. The hospital has 103 beds and is affiliated with Weill Cornell Medical School. The hospital provides comprehensive pediatric specialties and subspecialties to pediatric patients aged 0–20 throughout New York City. Komansky Children's Hospital features a Level II Trauma Center and houses the only pediatric burn unit in the region.  The hospital was named for trustee David Komansky

Lower Manhattan Hospital

On July 1, 2013, NYP announced its merger with the former New York Downtown Hospital to form the Lower Manhattan Hospital (LMH) campus of the NewYork-Presbyterian Hospital. LMH is one of the few hospitals in Lower Manhattan south of Greenwich Village. The campus operates 170 beds and offers a full range of inpatient and outpatient services. LMH serves the diverse neighborhoods of Wall Street, Battery Park City, Chinatown, SoHo, TriBeCa, Little Italy, and the Lower East Side, and is the closest acute care facility to both the Financial District and to the seat of New York City's government.

Queens

On July 10, 2015, NYP announced its merger with the former New York Hospital Queens (formerly known as Booth Memorial Medical Center) to form the Queens campus of the NewYork-Presbyterian Hospital.  Located in Flushing, Queens, NewYork-Presbyterian/Queens is a teaching hospital affiliated with Weill Cornell Medical College that serves Queens and metro New York residents. The 535-bed tertiary care facility provides services in 14 clinical departments and numerous subspecialties, including 15,000 surgeries and 4,000 infant deliveries each year. With its network of affiliated primary and multispecialty care physician practices and community-based health centers, the hospital provides approximately 162,000 ambulatory care visits and 124,000 emergency service visits annually.

Hudson Valley Hospital

Founded in 1889 by the Helping Hand Association, NewYork-Presbyterian/Hudson Valley Hospital, located in Cortlandt Manor, New York, serves residents of the Hudson Valley and Westchester County. The 128-bed facility provides a wide range of ambulatory care and inpatient services, with 350 physicians on staff in 43 specialties. The hospital is home to the region's only state-of-the-art, 24-hour "no wait" emergency department, which sees more than 39,000 visits per year. In 2011, the Cheryl R. Lindenbaum Cancer Center opened, offering the first comprehensive cancer center in the area, combining infusion, radiation therapy and support services all under one roof.

Brooklyn Methodist Hospital

NewYork-Presbyterian Westchester

Ronald O. Perelman Heart Institute
Ronald O. Perelman Heart Institute is a "medical town square" dedicated to the treatment of heart disease patients in New York City.  Ronald O. Perelman, chairman of MacAndrews & Forbes Holdings Inc., made a $50 million gift to the  NewYork-Presbyterian Hospital/Weill Cornell Medical Center on February 28, 2009, to establish the institute. The Heart Institute has a welcome center, a clinical trials enrollment center, and an interactive education resource center that includes medical information on heart disease — with an added focus on cardiac disease in women.

In popular culture
The ABC documentary series NY Med, produced by ABC News, features NewYork–Presbyterian Hospital/Weill Cornell Medical Center and NewYork–Presbyterian Hospital/Columbia University Medical Center.

Marvel Comics's fictional surgeon Doctor Strange attended Columbia University College of Physicians and Surgeons and completed his residency at NewYork-Presbyterian Hospital.

References

External links

NewYork-Presbyterian Hospital
NewYork-Presbyterian Emergency Medicine
NewYork-Presbyterian Children's Health
Medical Center Archives of NewYork-Presbyterian/Weill Cornell

 
Hospitals in Manhattan
Columbia University
Cornell University
1771 establishments in the Province of New York
Hospitals established in the 1770s
Teaching hospitals in New York City